Denis Viktorovich Kapustin (born 5 October 1970 in Kazan, Respublika Tatarstan) is a retired male triple jumper from Russia. Best known for winning the bronze medal at the 2000 Summer Olympics, he is also the 1994 European champion. His personal best jump is 17.65 metres, which he achieved in 1998.

International competitions

References

External links
 
 
 
 

1970 births
Living people
Sportspeople from Kazan
Russian male triple jumpers
Soviet male triple jumpers
Olympic athletes of Russia
Olympic bronze medalists for Russia
Olympic bronze medalists in athletics (track and field)
Athletes (track and field) at the 2000 Summer Olympics
Medalists at the 2000 Summer Olympics
Competitors at the 1991 Summer Universiade
World Athletics Championships athletes for Russia
European Athletics Championships winners
European Athletics Championships medalists
Russian Athletics Championships winners